Cardamine pentaphyllos, the five-leaflet bitter-cress or showy toothwort, is a flowering plant in the family Brassicaceae, native to Western and Central Europe in Slovenia and Croatia.

The Latin specific epithet pentaphyllos means "with five-lobed leaves". The feminine form pentaphylla is sometimes seen, but this is deemed incorrect.

This plant has gained the Royal Horticultural Society's Award of Garden Merit.

References

pentaphyllos
Plants described in 1753
Taxa named by Carl Linnaeus